The Schwedenturm ("Sweden Tower") in East Germany is a 35-metre-high rock formation made of sandstone in the hills of Saxon Switzerland near the spa town of Rathen and the famous Bastei rocks. From the car park for the Bastei, a path runs towards Schwedenlöcher. The Schwedenturm is situated on the right just before the entrance to a narrow ravine. Because it lies in the Saxon Switzerland Climbing Region the free-standing pinnacle may be used for climbing. Currently there are 14 different routes up the rock. It was here that the first grade Xb route in the mountain range was successfully climbed, route 6 (Versuch), by Bernd Arnold. The Schwedenturm was first climbed in 1905 by Rudolf Fehrmann and his brother Arymund.

External links 
 Rock information by the German Alpine Club: Schwedenturm – Rathener Gebiet

Rock formations of Saxon Switzerland
Climbing areas of Germany